Birchills is a residential area of Walsall in the West Midlands of England. The appropriate Walsall ward is Birchills Leamore. The population of this ward taken at the 2011 census was 14,775.

It is situated several hundred yards west of the town centre and is an established area containing many different housing types, though Victorian/Edwardian terraced houses and inter-war council houses are the most frequent type.

Reedswood Park is located in Birchills, as is Pouk Hill - a hill which inspired a 1970s Slade song.

Birchills has an above average proportion of ethnic minorities living in it, mostly Pakistani Muslims.

Birchills formerly was served by Birchills railway station which was on the Chase Line but closed in the 1930s.

Several tower blocks, built during the 1960s, are situated in the east of Birchills, near Walsall town centre. Murderer Raymond Leslie Morris was living in one of these flats with his wife at the time of his arrest on 4 November 1967.

A power station was opened in the north of Birchills in 1949, just a few years before the Beechdale council estate was developed at the far side. This power station served the Walsall area for 33 years until its closure in October 1982, although it was not demolished until March 1987. The site of the power station was redeveloped for housing and commerce during the 1990s.

References

Walsall